Paul Auguste Joseph Fauchille (11 February 1858 – 9 February 1926) was a French lawyer and scholar, best remembered as a pioneer of air law.
He was born in Loos, France, and studied law in Douai and at the University of Paris. An advocate at the Court of Appeals, a law professor and Member of the Institut de Droit International he promoted with his mentor Louis Renault the new interest in international law. 
He had been a co–founder and editor of the Revue Generale de Droit International Public (1894) and co–founder of the Institute of Higher International Studies (IHEI 1921) . His magnum opus became the four volume Traite de Droit international public 1921–26 which encompassed 4600 pages being still in print.

See also
Tokyo Convention

References

1858 births
1926 deaths
19th-century French lawyers
20th-century French lawyers
People from Nord (French department)